Dr Gideon Fell is a fictional character created by John Dickson Carr.  He is the protagonist of 23 mystery novels from 1933 through 1967, as well as a few short stories.  Carr was an American who lived most of his adult life in England; Dr. Fell is an Englishman who lives in the London suburbs.

Dr Fell is supposedly based upon G. K. Chesterton (author of the Father Brown stories), whose physical appearance and personality were similar to those of Doctor Fell.

Biography

Dr. Fell is a corpulent man with a moustache who wears a cape and a shovel hat and walks with the aid of two canes. His age is not specified; in his first appearance, in a 1933 novel, he is said to be "not too old" but with a kind of ancient quality about him. He is frequently described as bringing the spirit of Father Christmas or Old King Cole into a room. In his early appearances he was portrayed as a lexicographer, but this description gradually disappeared and he was thereafter mostly referred to as working on a monumental history of the beer-drinking habits of the English people.

He is an amateur sleuth, frequently called upon by the police, whom he frustrates in the usual manner of fictional detectives by refusing to reveal his deductions until he has arrived at a complete solution to the problem. The most frequently recurring police character was Superintendent Hadley. Most of Fell's exploits concern the unravelling of locked room mysteries or of "impossible crimes". When he himself becomes frustrated, he is likely to cry out, "Archons of Athens!"

When Dr. Fell is not traveling, he lives with his wife in a somewhat cluttered house. The wife's name is never given, and little of her character is revealed, except that she is rather eccentric as well. She goes unmentioned in many of the books, but an allusion to her late in the series indicates that the couple's domestic life is unchanged. The Fells have no children.

Chapter 17 of the novel The Three Coffins contains Dr. Fell's "locked room lecture", in which he delineates many of the methods by which apparently locked-room or impossible-crime murders might be committed. In the course of his discourse, he states, off-handedly, that he and his listeners are, of course, characters in a book.

Chronology

 1933, Hag's Nook 
 1933, The Mad Hatter Mystery
 1934, The Eight of Swords
 1934, The Blind Barber
 1935, Death-Watch
 1935, The Hollow Man (The Three Coffins) 
 1936, The Arabian Nights Murder
 1937, To Wake the Dead 
 1938, The Crooked Hinge 
 1939, The Problem of the Green Capsule (The Black Spectacles/Mystery in Limelight)
 1939, The Problem of the Wire Cage  
 1940, The Man Who Could Not Shudder
 1941, The Case of the Constant Suicides 
 1941, Death Turns the Tables (The Seat of the Scornful)
 1944, Till Death Do Us Part  
 1946, He Who Whispers
 1947, The Sleeping Sphinx
 1949, Below Suspicion
 1958, The Dead Man's Knock
 1960, In Spite of Thunder
 1965, The House at Satan's Elbow 
 1966, Panic in Box C
 1967, Dark of the Moon
 1991, Fell and Foul Play

Adaptations

Television
The Seat of the Scornful was adapted as a 1956 episode of the BBC Sunday Night Theatre. Fell was portrayed by Finlay Currie.

Radio
The Clock Strikes Eight, written by Carr was broadcast on On 18 May 1944, for the anthology series Appointment with Fear. Richard George played Fell.

The Hollow Man was adapted for Saturday Night Theatre, with Norman Shelley as Fell.

Donald Sinden played Dr. Fell in a series of eight BBC Radio adaptations.

References

External links
Mystery list Dr. Fell books

Book series introduced in 1933
Literary characters introduced in 1933
Fictional amateur detectives
Novel series
Characters in American novels of the 20th century